Etna Comics – International Festival of Comics, Games and Pop Culture (Italian: Etna Comics – Festival Internazionale del Fumetto, del Gioco e della Cultura Pop) is an annual convention held in Catania, Sicily at the beginning of June. The venue is The Ciminiere convention center (Italian: Centro Fieristico Le Ciminiere). As its name suggests, the festival focuses on comics, cartoons, gaming and pop culture in general. The name Etna Comics refers to Mount Etna, the volcano rising behind the city of Catania. With its 100,000 visitors it is one of the largest comic festivals in Italy, especially in the South.

History

Etna Comics was inaugurated in 2011 aiming to create a place where fans of comic books living souther than Naples could meet. Not only this result was fully accomplished, but the festival was an immediate success, becoming almost instantly an important national and international event, attracting domestic and global stars like Rutger Hauer, Matt Dillon, Giancarlo Esposito, Dario Argento and others.

Since its first edition, the festival has kept improving and expanding in dimensions and attendance. Whereas the first and the second edition took place in just one building of Le Ciminiere, from 2014 on the festival expanded to the entire venue, outdoor areas included, taking place in a total area larger than 45,000 square meters (on many levels). The convention center includes two auditoriums/movie theaters (1200 and 600 seats) a conference room (220 seats) and an outdoor stage area (2,000 square meters) where concerts and shows are performed. Its location, in front of the sea yet right in the city center, is well serverd by public transport: the central railway station, the central bus station and Giovanni XXIII Metro Station of the Catania Metro are at a very small, walkable distance.

From 2017 on, a 1,500 square meters tensile structure is set up in front of the convention center, increasing the area of the festival and hosting the board games section.

During the years, the festival generated extensions and spin-offs like Etna Comics OFF or Etna Comics – Day Zero (downsized, simpler conventions taking place in winter or in sping and meant to be an hors d'oeuvre for the main event coming up in the summer), or Etna Comics in città – Fuori salone della cultura pop. The latter one was meant to be an offshoot of the festival right in the heart of the historic center of town: installation art, shows and food stalls were arranged in Villa Pacini, a small historic park near Piazza Duomo, during the days of the main convention. So far, Etna Comics in città has taken place only in the 2019 edition of the festival. For a small period of time Etna Comics had its own official comic books shop and coffee shop in a small galleria commerciale near Le Ciminiere; this shop is now closed.

Skipping 2020 and 2021 due to sanitary restrictions related to the coronavirus pandemic, the festival came back in 2022. The poster of this edition pictured a phoenix over the Latin motto Melior de cinere surgo (I rise from my ashes in a better state than before): this refers to the phoenix sculpted in the Porta Garibaldi and it is an allegory for the city of Catania (rebuilt several times after eruptions from Mount Etna and earthquakes), for the human spirit prevailng over adversity, and for the festival coming back after a two-year stop. The 2022 edition marks the tenth anniversary of the festival. For the occasion, Etna Comics inaugurated a new section called Taboocom about adult comics and erotism in art and pop culture; the new section is meant to explore topics like freedom and sexuality, or women's rights. The tenth "comeback" edition was a striking success as the festival got over the 100,000 visitors threshold, confirming, ten years after its inception, its relevance and centrality in the national and global context.

Structure

Etna Comics usually takes place at the beginning of June and lasts about five days. Day tickets or full event passes are available to buy online or at the ticket office. 

The festival is organized in the following sections:

 Comics, about comic books in general, hosting artists, publishers, comic books shops etc.; this is the original and core section of the festival; 
 Games, about board games and roleplaying games, with big free-access gaming areas hosting hundreds of gaming sessions;
 Videogames, about videogames, with retrogaming and LAN parties areas;
 Family, with special activities for children and their parents;
 Letteratura Fantasy, about fantasy fiction;
 Asian Wave, about japanese and asian culture in general; Japan is famous for manga and anime production and this section is meant to explore its old and new traditions, aiming to provide a total immersion into the nipponic way of life; food stalls serving ramen and a maid café offer a chance to taste japanese cuisine; cultural phenomena of neighboring nations (e.g. K-pop) fit in this section too; 
 Altrimondi, about science fiction and related sub-genres (steampunk, post-apocalyptic, etc.); this section includes big sci-fi re-enactments (which are usually set up/performed in the outdoor areas of the venue) and a Live action role-playing games area;
 Movie, about cinema and audiovisual media, with screenings, conferences, etc.; 
 Taboocom, about adult comics and erotism in art; this section was presented in the 2022 edition of the festival and it is meant to explore topics like freedom and sexuality, or women's rights.
 Newtube Alley, about streaming media;
 Palco, the stage area where concerts and shows are performed;
 Mostre, the area where exhibitions are on display; several exhibits are set up every edition of the festival, focusing every time on different topics (mostly about comic book culture, but also about cinema or pop culture).

Although not covered by an official section of the event, cosplay is an important part of Etna Comics. Many cosplayers attend the convention, roaming around, being available for pictures, offering free hugs, etc. Several cosplay contests and shows are also organized.

Editions

References

External links

Le Ciminiere Official website

Comics conventions
Gaming conventions
Multigenre conventions
Catania
Sicily